Student Life (StudLife) is the independent student-run newspaper of Washington University in St. Louis. It was founded in 1878 and incorporated in 1999. It is published by the Washington University Student Media, Inc. and is not subject to the approval of the University administration, thus making it an independent student voice.

It is published regularly every Monday and Thursday. Special issues include orientation and commencement issues, an April Fool's Day issue (called Student Libel); and a Valentine's Day issue centered on sex (called Student Love). It has won multiple National Pacemaker Awards, recognizing the best college newspapers in the country, most recently in 2011.

It is an affiliate of UWIRE, which distributes and promotes its content to their network.

Sections
News is the largest section in Student Life, appearing in each issue. This section reports on events pertaining to the Washington University community, St. Louis news, and national news.
Forum also appears in each issue and consists of columns written by the regular Forum editors and staff columnists. Contributions are also accepted from the University community. Forum also publishes a staff editorial written by the newspaper's Editorial Board. The Editorial Board is led by the Senior Forum Editor, and it consists of the Forum Editors, Editor-in-Chief, Managing Editor(s) and Senior Editors. Letters to the Editor and Editorial Cartoons are also published in Forum.
Sports appears in every issue and provides the latest scores in Bears games as well as profiles of the players.
Cadenza is Student Life's arts and entertainment section. Cadenza features music, movie, theatre and TV reviews, as well as commentary on both national and local entertainment news. Cadenza was previously a separate entity from Student Life, but it was incorporated into the paper in 2003.
Scene is the lifestyles section in Student Life. It runs in every issue and focuses on campus trends and the activities of students and faculty. Scene covers a broad range of topics.  Scene's regular features include a romance column, restaurant reviews, a fashion column and the newly added Health Beat.
The Photo section occasionally publishes photo essays ranging in topic from engineering antics to profiles of homeless people.

Awards 
 National Pacemaker Award (2000, 2005, 2009, 2011)
 Online Pacemaker (2011)
 Missouri College Media Association — Sweepstakes cumulative winner, with points awarded and tallied from individual categories (2009, 2010, 2013, 2018)

Alumni

Ken Cooper — former national editor for The Boston Globe
Bill Dedman — Pulitzer Prize-winning investigative reporter and author of the bestselling biography Empty Mansions
Sam Guzik — head of product for New York Public Radio
Jonathan Greenberger — ABC News Washington bureau chief and executive producer of This Week with George Stephanopoulos
Michael Isikoff — chief investigative correspondent for Yahoo! News, formerly of NBC News, Newsweek
Sarah Kliff — healthcare journalist for The New York Times, formerly with The Washington Post and Vox
Jeff Lean — investigative editor at The Washington Post
James T. Madore — business reporter at Newsday
Laura Meckler — national education correspondent for The Washington Post, former White House reporter for The Wall Street Journal
Mike Peters — winner of the 1981 Pulitzer Prize for Editorial Cartooning and creator of Mother Goose & Grimm
Perry Stein — national Department of Justice reporter for The Washington Post

References

External links
 Student Life official website

Student newspapers published in Missouri
Washington University in St. Louis
Publications established in 1878